Dentist on the Job is a 1961 British comedy film  directed by C. M. Pennington-Richards, the sequel to Dentist in the Chair (1960). It was released in the US with the title Get On with It!. The film was co-written by Hugh Woodhouse and Hazel Adair. It stars Bob Monkhouse, Kenneth Connor, Ronnie Stevens and Eric Barker repeating their roles from the previous film. Other actors appearing in the film include Shirley Eaton, Richard Wattis and Charles Hawtrey. Monkhouse, Eaton, Connor, Barker and Hawtrey had all previously acted together in unrelated 1958 comedy Carry On Sergeant.

Plot
Colonel Proudfoot of Proudfoot Industries aims to entice a couple of dentists to advertise "Dreem", a revolutionary type of toothpaste, but he knows that if the dentists learn that they are part of an advertising campaign, they will be struck off. His cousin, the director of a Dental School (also Barker), sees his chance to rid the field of dentistry of two newly qualified incompetents David Cookson and Brian Dexter. However, once employed by Proudfoot, they set about improving on Dreem's terrible formula, and accidentally succeed in creating a much better toothpaste. Their attempts to convince Proudfoot of its merits are foiled by Proudfoot's assistant, Macreedy.

They then read a newspaper article about the forthcoming launch of a rocket from a British base carrying a satellite which will continuously broadcast a taped message of peace from the President of the United States, and conceive a plan. They record an impromptu commercial for the new formula Dreem and, with the help of an ex-convict friend Sam Field and actress Jill Venner, manage to smuggle it aboard the rocket in place of the President's speech, guaranteeing Proudfoot years of free advertising. The resulting publicity ensures the product's success and the pair are promoted.

Cast
 Bob Monkhouse as David Cookson
 Kenneth Connor as Sam Field
 Ronnie Stevens as Brian Dexter
 Shirley Eaton as Jill Venner
 Eric Barker as Colonel J.J. Proudfoot / The Dean
 Reginald Beckwith as Mr. Duff
 Richard Wattis as Macreedy
 Charles Hawtrey as Mr. Roper
 Richard Caldicot as Prison Governor
 Cyril Chamberlain as Director
 David Horne as Admiral Southbound
 Graham Stark as Sourfaced Man
 Charlotte Mitchell as Mrs Burke
 Arthur Mullard (uncredited)
 Andria Lawrence (uncredited)

Legacy
The studio logos, opening credits and a brief portion of the opening scene is added to the start of Monty Python and the Holy Grail on its special edition DVD. The clip ends with a spluttering, unseen "projectionist" realising he has played the wrong film. A "slide" then appears urging the audience to wait one moment please while the operator changes reels.

References

External links

1961 films
1961 comedy films
British black-and-white films
British comedy films
British sequel films
Films directed by C. M. Pennington-Richards
Films about advertising
1960s English-language films
1960s British films